The Royal Standard of Spain (Estandarte Real or Estandarte del Rey) is the official flag of the King of Spain. It comprises a crimson square, traditional colour of both Castilian and Spanish monarchs, with the coat of arms of the King in the center. It is raised over the official royal residence in Madrid, the Palacio de la Zarzuela and other Spanish royal sites, when the monarch is in residence and displayed on his official car as small flag. The current flag was adopted when Felipe VI acceded the throne as King of Spain on 19 June 2014. The Royal Standard is regulated by Rule 2 of Royal Decree 527/2014, 20 June, an amendment to Title II of Spanish Royal Decree 1511/1977 adopting Flags, Standards, Guidons, Insignia and Emblems Regulation.

The Royal Guidon

The Royal Guidon (Guión), the military personal ensign, was also adopted on 19 June 2014. It is described by Rule 1 of Royal Decree 527/2014, an amendment to Title II, Rule 1 of Spanish Royal Decree 1511/1977.

It is similar to the Royal Standard except the Royal Guidon has a gold surround. It is made of silk's taffeta and measures 80 x 80 cm in size. It is the personal command sign or positional flag of the monarch and traditionally was carried with him. The proportions of the coat of arms are smaller than on the standard.

Historical standards, guidons and banners of arms of Spanish monarchs
The heraldic standard, also known as the pendón real, has been, as in other European monarchies, the personal flag of the Spanish monarchs and has been used in events of greater solemnity. It was formed by the elements of the monarch's shield without the exterior adornments and has not recovered since its disappearance in 1931.

The royal standard is the personal banner of the monarch. The guidon, of military use, was formed from the reign of Philip II by the same elements of the standard but incorporating the Cross of Burgundy, a fringe and a cordoncillo. During the period of the House of Austria, the Cross of Burgundy did not appear frequently in the royal standard. The Catholic Monarchs and Charles I (as monarchs of Castile) used the guidon of the Castilian monarchs, the Banda de Castilla which was a square flag of crimson color in which there was a band between two dragons. The Catholic Monarchs included in the Band of Castile the yoke and arrows which were replaced with the Columns of Hercules during the reign of Charles I. Fernando the Catholic also used the guidon that corresponded to him as monarch of Aragon. The Catholic Monarchs also frequently used, since 1492, a banner that consisted of a white cloth with their coat of arms.

Evolution
The Banner is the ceremonial ensign of the monarch and the royal standard or royal flag is his ensign for public use.
From Philip II's reign the Royal Guidon was the same as the royal standard or royal flag with a cross of Burgundy and gold surround.

The Standard and the Guidon of the Princess of Asturias

The Standard of the Princess of Asturias (Estandarte de la Princesa de Asturias) is regulated by Royal Decree 979/2015, an amendment to Title II of Spanish Royal Decree 1511/1977.

The Princess's Standard comprises a light blue (the colour of the Flag of Asturias) square flag displaying the coat of arms of the Prince of Asturias in the center. The Guidon, her military ensign has a gold surround.

Spanish Royal Banners in Windsor 

A banner of arms is a square or oblong heraldic flag that is larger than a pennon. It bears the entire coat of arms of the owner, composed precisely as upon a shield but in a square or rectangular shape. Banners of knights of the Order of the Garter are displayed during their lifetime at St George's Chapel in Windsor. From Victorian times, Garter banners have been approximately 5 feet by 5 feet and have a fringe. Reigning European monarchs are admitted to the Order as "Strangers". Juan Carlos I and his successor Felipe VI are concurrently Stranger Knights of the Garter. The Spanish monarch's banner (like the arms) is divided into four quarters: the 1st for Castile, 2nd for León, 3rd for Aragon and 4th for Navarre; enté en point, with a pomegranate for Granada and an inescutcheon with the arms of the regnant House of Bourbon-Anjou. The fringe is golden, as for other foreign monarchs and British Royal Family members.

The castle of Castile, with three windows and narrow, and the Navarrese chains are carefully detailed in both banners, according to the designs displayed in the amendment to Title II of Royal Decree 527/2014 (for King Felipe VI) and the original contents of Title II of Spanish Royal Decree 1511/1977 (for King Juan Carlos).

The tinctures of the pomegranate are changed in the banner of King Juan Carlos, Gules seeded Or, and it is carefully designed and coloured in his successor's one, proper (light) seeded Gules. The colour of the lion is so darkly in the case of King Juan Carlos and precise in Felipe VI's heraldic flag. Other Spanish members of the Garter were Alfonso V of Aragon (1450-†1458), Ferdinand the Catholic, Charles I (1508-†1558), Philip II (1554-†1598), Ferdinand VII (1814–†1833), Alfonso XII (1881–†1885) and Alfonso XIII (1902–†1941).

See also
Coat of arms of the King of Spain
Coat of arms of the Prince of Asturias
Heraldic flag
Spanish monarchy

References

Inline citations

Sources referenced
Royal Decree 1511/1977, including amendments. BOE.es 
The flag in the Spanish Armada. Armada Española 
The Royal Standard of Spain. Flags of the World
The Standard of the Prince of Asturias. Flags of the World

External links
Royal and Governmental Standards of Spain (Images). Web of Luis Miguel Arias (In Spanish)

 1
Spanish monarchy
Spain
Flags displaying animals